The Whitehill Formation, alternatively written as White Hill Formation and formerly known as White Band or Whitehill or White Hill Member, is a regional Early Permian (Artinskian to Kungurian, dating to around 282 to 275 Ma) geologic formation belonging to the Ecca Group in the southeastern ǁKaras Region of southeastern Namibia and Eastern, Northern and Western Cape provinces of South Africa.

The formation comprises black shales, mudstones, siltstones, dolomite beds, gypsum and halite layers and a layer of tuff within the formation. Total Organic Carbon (TOC) values average 4.5% with a range from 0.5 to 14.7%, placing the formation in the same range as the well-known Barnett Shale and Marcellus Formation of the United States.

The Whitehill Formation of the Karoo and Nama or Kalahari Basin is contemporaneous with the Huab Formation of the Huab Basin and is correlated with a series of formations in the Pelotas and Paraná Basins in southeastern Brazil, deposited in a larger basinal area, 150 million years before the break-up of Pangea. The abundance of Glossopteris and Mesosaurus fossils are characteristic of the Gondwanan correlation across present-day South America, Africa, Antarctica and Australia. The Whitehill Formation has provided fossil reptiles, insects, fish and flora.

Description 
The Whitehill Formation is an extensive Lower Permian unit, cropping out in a thin band stretching from the Western Cape in South Africa through southeastern Namibia and the Northern Cape in the north to the Eastern Cape of South Africa in the east. The formation is part of the Karoo Supergroup, more precisely the Ecca Group, where it overlies the Prince Albert Formation and is overlain by the Collingham Formation, and in the southern Karoo by the Tierberg Formation.

Single zircon U-Pb SHRIMP dating yielded an age of 279.1 ± 1.5 Ma for the Uhabis River Tuff present in the upper strata of the underlying Prince Albert Formation. The Khabus Tuff within the Whitehill Formation provided a weighted mean 206Pb/238U age of 280.5 ± 2.1 Ma. Other authors use an estimated age for the whole formation of around 275 Ma.

The formation is highly conductive and can be traced in seismic profiles across nearly the whole basin.

Lithologies 
The Whitehill Formation has been subdivided into two major subunits according to their weathering color in outcrops. The lower and thicker part consists mainly of bluish- to greenish-grey shales and mudstones, which grade upward into more light brownish, buff weathering, slightly coarser grained siltstones. This zone is conformably overlain by white weathering shales, with intermittent chert lenses and pyritic stringers; the latter rarely exceeding  in thickness. The sedimentary structure is generally massive, however laminations do occur that resemble algal lamellae. The formation appears white due to weathering of pyrite (sulfide) at surface to sulfate (gypsum). This section is grading upward into dark carbonaceous, bluish-grey weathering shales. From a lithological point of view only the upper part of the succession consists of the Whitehill-characteristic carbonaceous black shales.

A tuffaceous zone occurs within the Whitehill Formation a few metres below the stratigraphic interval, which contains several dolomitic limestones. This limestone interval forms a mappable unit in all outcrops of the Whitehill Formation in central southern Namibia. In the Northern Cape, the formation is intruded by dolerite sills. The sediments are considered to be deposited in an anoxic environment. Besides pyrite, the shales contain dolomite lenses near the base. The rocks are highly folded and faulted by the Cape orogeny forming the Cape Fold Belt, and thus, interpreted as "decollement".

Depositional environments 

The Whitehill Formation was deposited in a shallow inland sea with little to no connection to the open ocean. This sea, stretching from the Paraná Basin in current southeastern Brazil to the Karasberg and Karoo Basins of southwestern Africa, probably represents the transition from marine to brackish or freshwater conditions, in sediment-starved, stratified and anoxic embayments.

From outcrops in southernmost Namibia (Aussenkjer-Noordoewer area) it became evident that the boundary between the Prince Albert and the Whitehill Formation represents the turning point from a progradational to a retrogradational succession. The tuffs within the Whitehill Formation, as well as other tuffaceous beds found in the underlying and overlying formations, were possibly sourced by volcanoes located in present-day South America, although other interpretations of the tuffs of the Dwyka and Ecca Groups propose a general source along the southern Panthalassian margin of current southern Africa.

Correlations 

The Whitehill Formation is time equivalent with the Pietermaritzburg Formation of the Waterberg Basin of southern Namibia. To the north in the Karoo Basin, the shales of the Whitehill Formation are laterally equivalent with the Vryheid Formation. The upper part of the formation is correlated with the Irati Formation of the Paraná and Pelotas Basins in Rio Grande do Sul, Brazil, the Black Rock Member of the Falkland Islands, and with the Huab Formation in the Huab Basin of northwestern Namibia. The lower section correlates with the Palermo and Rio Bonito Formations of the Paraná Basin and the Prince Albert Formation of the Karoo. The Permian sequence in the Huab Basin is much thinner than those of the Paraná and Karoo Basins. The fossil assemblages of Glossopteris and Mesosaurus are known from other parts of Gondwana; the Vryheid Formation of South Africa and coal deposits of the Lower Permian in Australia.

Fossil content 

The Whitehill Formation has provided a variety of fossil insects, rare flora and Mesosaurus fossils, typical for the Permian of Gondwana. The mesosaurids are preserved as molds filled with gypsum crystals; they are commonly disarticulated.  More rarely, casts of mesosaurids are found. Plant stems are similarly rare, and most commonly occur as chloritized fragments floating in the pink lower, more massive mudstone succession of the Whitehill Formation, while coprolites containing either palaeoniscoid scales or fragmentary crustacean carapaces are preserved on bedding planes.

The following fossils have been reported from the Whitehill Formation:

Reptiles
 Mesosaurus tenuidens
 Noteosaurus africanus
 Stereosternum tumidum

Fish
 Palaeoniscum capensis
 Watsonichthys lotzi

Insects
 Afrochoristella maclachlani
 Afrocupes firmae
 Sharovia permiafricana

Flora
 Lepidodendron whitehillianum

Economic geology 
The high concentration of organic matter in the black shales of the Whitehill Formation make it an interesting target for shale gas exploration. The formation is considered the prime focus for potential shale gas prospects in the Southern Karoo. TOC levels average at 4.5% TOC, and range from 0.5 to 14.7%, comparable to known shale gas producing formations as the Marcellus Formation and the Barnett Shale. The formation is considered to have economic potential in an area around Beaufort West to Graaff-Reinet.

Results from Rock-Eval pyrolysis, vitrinite reflectance measurements, open pyrolysis and thermovaporization analyses carried out on core samples drilled through the formation show that organic matter has reached an advanced stage of kerogen development. These rocks can therefore be classified as overmature, likely because of the thermotectonic processes related to the Cape orogeny forming the Cape Fold Belt overprint on lower Karoo rocks in the study area. It is possible that the maturity of the shales decreases farther north in the Karoo basin.

See also 
 List of fossiliferous stratigraphic units in Namibia
 List of fossiliferous stratigraphic units in South Africa
 Geology of Namibia
 Geology of South Africa
 Ganigobis Formation
 Gondwanide orogeny

References

Bibliography

Further reading 
 J. M. Anderson and H. M. Anderson. 1985. Palaeoflora of Southern Africa. Prodromus of South African Megafloras Devonian to Lower Cretaceous 1-423
 H. Geertsema and J. A. van den Heever. 1996. A new beetle, Afrocupes firmae gen. et sp. nov. (Permocupedidae), from the late Palaeozoic Whitehill Formation of South Africa. South African Journal of Science 92:497-499
 G. Gürich. 1889. Ditrochosaurus capensis - ein neuer Mesosaurier aus der Karooformation Süd-Afrikas. Zeitschrift der Deutschen Geologischen Gesellschaft 41(4):641-652
 I. R. McLachlan and A. M. Anderson. 1977. Fossil insect wings from the Early Permian White Band Formation, South Africa. Palaeontologia Africana 20:83-86
 T. Rossmann. 2000. Studien an Mesosauriern (Amniota inc sed: Mesosauridae): 2 Neue Erkenntnisse zur Anatomie, mit Berücksichtigung der Taxonomie von Mesosaurus pleurogaster (Seeley). Senckenbergiana lethaea 80(1):13-28
 H. G. Seeley. 1892. The Mesosauria of South Africa. Quarterly Journal of the Geological Society of London 48:586-604
 E. Stromer. 1914. Die ersten fossilen Reptilreste aus Deutsch-Südwestafrika und ihre geologische Bedeutung. Centralblatt für Mineralogie, Geologie und Paläontologie 1914:530-541

Geologic formations of Namibia
Geologic formations of South Africa
Permian System of Africa
Permian South Africa
Artinskian Stage
Kungurian
Shale formations
Dolomite formations
Mudstone formations
Tuff formations
Evaporite deposits
Shallow marine deposits
Lacustrine deposits
Source rock formations
Shale gas
Permian southern paleotemperate deposits
Paleontology in Namibia
Paleontology in South Africa
Geography of ǁKaras Region
Geography of the Eastern Cape
Geography of the Northern Cape
Geography of the Western Cape
Ecca Group